Elizabeth Ambogo (born 28 July 1990) is a Kenyan footballer who plays as a defender. She has been a member of the Kenya women's national team.

International career
Ambogo played for Kenya at the 2016 Africa Women Cup of Nations.

See also
List of Kenya women's international footballers

References

1990 births
Living people
Kenyan women's footballers
Women's association football defenders
Kenya women's international footballers